Jam Raidhan was the 13th Jam (Sultan) of Sindh. Historians have disparate views of Jam Raidhan; many have argued that Jam Raidhan and Jam Sanjar are different names for a single ruler of Sindh.

Ascension
Jam Raidhan lived in Kutch. Following the death of Jam Sikandar. Raidhan ruled from 1444-1453 A.D. he went to Thatta, and collecting the men of that city, he said:

Amongst those men no one was fit to be king, so all of them agreed to place him on the throne. Over a year and a half, he extended his rule to include the whole of Sind, from the ocean to Kajur, Mullee, and Khoondee, the boundaries of Matheluh, and Oobawruh.

Historiography
The accounts of historians Mir Ali Sher Qaune Thattvi and Mir Muhammad Masoom Shah Bakhri consider Jam Rai Dinu (Raidhan) and Jam Sanjar separate rulers of the Samaa dynasty. According to the commentary of historian M.H Panhwar on the rule of the Samaa dynasty, the name Jam Raidhan is synonymous with Jam Rai Dinu as it is used in the folklores of Sind, and is still in use by the  Samaat tribes of Sind.

Death
Jam Raidhan died three days after drinking poisoned wine, given to one of Raidhan's attendants by Jam Sanjar.

References 

Pakistani royalty
History of Sindh
Jamote people